Ibrahim Mustapha (born 18 June 2000) is a Ghanaian football attacking midfielder who plays for LASK.

Career 
On 15 February 2022, Mustapha joined Novi Pazar on loan from Red Star Belgrade for the second round of the 2021–22 season.

References

External links
 
 

2000 births
People from Tamale, Ghana
Living people
Association football defenders
Red Star Belgrade footballers
FK Zlatibor Čajetina players
FK Novi Pazar players
Serbian SuperLiga players
Serbian First League players
Ghanaian footballers
Ghanaian expatriate footballers
Expatriate footballers in Serbia
Ghanaian expatriate sportspeople in Serbia